Eva Gray is a stage and screen actress. Eva is known for her performance as Marilyn Monroe and also as Trudy Lite – International Celebrity Life Coach to the Stars, hosting the satirical television comedy series 'The Trudy Lite Show' and 'The Trudy Lite Chat Show'. Eva moved from London to Teignmouth in Devon in 2014 to enable her to care for her older brother, who has paranoid schizophrenia. She has a home studio with voiceover and green screen equipment to enable her to continue her acting and voice over career from her home.

Youth
Eva Gray's grandfather, a Polish aristocrat, was arrested during World War II by Stalin's troops when they invaded and took possession of the family farm near Vilno. When Stalin and Hitler broke ties, her grandfather fought for the British Army and the family settled in Britain where her father met her mother. She was born in Kingston Hospital and grew up in Surrey. She studied acting at RADA.

Career

Eva Gray began her career working for The Artaud Company in London's West End, in the role of Lulu in 'Intimacy", based on the short story by Jean-Paul Sartre and Michael Almaz.

In April 2012, Eva took to the catwalk as a Celebrity Model for 'Celebrity Fashion Rocks', a charity event in aid of children's charity Cloud 9 and animal charities Teckels and K9-Angels, organised by Willie Carson and Russell Nurding at the Sundial Theatre in Cirencester.

In February 2012, Eva played the role of Carla in 'Brotherly Love', a semi-autobiographical play written and directed by David Schaal, for the Real London Ensemble Company.

Eva played the role of Cecilia Huddlestone, a central character in the period comedy play 'The Unrest Cure' by Plum Roll Productions.

Gray has appeared in Casualty, Goodnight Sweetheart, Dalziel and Pascoe, French and Saunders, amongst others, and played the leading role of Portia du Pont in Sooty Heights. She has appeared in many theatrical performances, including the title role in Strindberg's Miss Julie in 2007 (directed by Conrad Blakemore), Pansy in John Symond's The Poison Maker (2006), Branwen in J.B. Priestley's The Long Mirror (2006 and again in 2011), several more productions of Jean-Paul Sartre's Intimacy (adapted by Michael Almaz) in the West End, Hampstead and Brighton – at different times playing both the characters in this two-hander and also in productions to a sequel to the story by Michael Almaz entitled "After Intimacy".

Her award-winning performance as Marilyn Monroe in All That Loving Stuff received critical acclaim and, following a successful run at the Gateway Theatre, Chester transferred to London and the Yvonne Arnaud Theatre, then toured nationally and internationally. In July and August 2011 she played the role of Eleanor Bryant in 'Mirror Mirror' by Robert Calvert (the former lead singer of Hawkwind).

Gray has appeared in several independent and numerous short films. Feature films include The 13th Sign (2000), black comedy Dead Money (2004) and they yet to be released Dead Crazy.

In January 2014, Eva appeared at The Cockpit Theatre in London playing the role of the sexually charged Margo in an extract from 'Someone's Lost the Plot', a new play by Peter Ramsey and Mary Dawson.

Gray is a Lifetime Voting Member of BAFTA.

Personal life

Eva is a dedicated vegan and is involved with several animal welfare charities.

Eva appeared with her partner ("The Vegans") in the first episodes of the reality TV series Coach Trip but they were the first couple to be voted off the show by the other contestants.

References

External links
The Trudy Lite Show on YouTube
The Story of Trudy Lite
Trudy Lite's website
Eva Gray's website
Spotlight CV for Eva Gray

Eva Gray on Vimeo
Eva Gray on Facebook
Eva Gray on Twitter

1971 births
English stage actresses
English television actresses
English film actresses
Living people
People from Kingston upon Thames
Alumni of RADA